Larissa Inangorore (born April 1, 1984) is a Burundian former swimmer, who specialized in sprint freestyle events. Inangorore qualified for the women's 100 m freestyle at the 2004 Summer Olympics in Athens, by receiving a Universality place from FINA. She posted an invitation time of 1:26.31 at the All-Africa Games in Abuja, Nigeria. She participated in the first heat against two other swimmers Carolina Cerqueda of Andorra and Gloria Koussihouede. She finished behind Cerqueda in second spot by a wide 23.56-second margin in her personal best of 1:23.90. Inangorore failed to advance into the semifinals, as she placed forty-ninth overall in the preliminaries.

References

1984 births
Living people
Burundian female swimmers
Olympic swimmers of Burundi
Swimmers at the 2004 Summer Olympics
Burundian female freestyle swimmers
20th-century Burundian people
21st-century Burundian people